is a junction railway station in the city of Oyama, Tochigi, Japan, operated by the East Japan Railway Company (JR East). The station is also a freight depot for the Japan Freight Railway Company (JR Freight).

Overview
This station is the representative station of Oyama City, the second largest city in Tochigi Prefecture, and the largest terminal station next to Utsunomiya Station in the prefecture.

Lines

Oyama Station is served by the following lines.
 Tōhoku Shinkansen
 Utsunomiya Line (Tōhoku Main Line)
 Shōnan-Shinjuku Line
 Mito Line
 Ryōmō Line

Station layout
The Shinkansen portion of the station has one side platform and one island platform, both of which are elevated. The local portion of the station has two bay platforms (Platforms 6 and 8) for the Ryomo Line and three island platforms (Platforms 9 and 10, 12 and 13, 15 and 16) of the other local lines. There are no platforms 2, 3, 7, 11, 14.

Platforms

 Most up Shinkansen services use platform 4.
 Some trains on the Ryōmō Line offering through service to Utsunomiya operate from Platform 9.

History
 July 16, 1885: The station opens on what later becomes the Tōhoku Main Line.
 May 22, 1888: The Ryōmō Line opens.
 January 16, 1889: The Mito Line opens.
 June 23, 1982: The Tōhoku Shinkansen opens.

Passenger statistics
In fiscal 2019, the station was used by an average of 22,471 passengers daily (boarding passengers only).

See also
 List of railway stations in Japan

References

External links

 Oyama Station information 
 Guide map for Oyama station 

Stations of East Japan Railway Company
Stations of Japan Freight Railway Company
Tōhoku Shinkansen
Tōhoku Main Line
Utsunomiya Line
Ryōmō Line
Mito Line
Railway stations in Tochigi Prefecture
Railway stations in Japan opened in 1885
Oyama, Tochigi